Hannah Barnett-Trager (born Hannah Barnett) (1870–1943) was an English writer and activist. She resided and worked primarily in Palestine.

Personal life
Trager was born in London, but emigrated with her parents to Jerusalem in December 1871 when she was one year old. Her father, Zerah Barnett, was Lithuanian and had run a successful factory for fur products in London, gaining British citizenship in October 1871. In Palestine he went bankrupt, and the family returned to London, moving back to Jerusalem in 1874. After several more moves between London and Jerusalem her father became one of the founders of Petah Tikva, and the family lived there for parts of the 1870s and 1880s. In 1891 the family moved to Jaffa where her father lived for the rest of his life.

In 1887 the family spent some time in London, where Hannah remained when the others returned. She married businessman Israel Gottman in 1888 and had two daughters; Gottman died young after business problems and bankruptcy. She supported herself and her daughters by working as a midwife, and married Joseph Trager, a chemist who was later incapacitated through tuberculosis. In 1911 her daughter Rose died aged 18 or 19, and her daughter Sarah committed suicide in 1924 aged 34 or 35. Trager was initially charged with Sarah's murder, but received an apology from the court after two months.

In 1926 Trager returned to Palestine and rejoined her father, her brothers and their families. She lived in Tel Aviv and later in Bene Berak, and died in September 1943. She was buried in Nahalat Yitzhak Cemetery.  A street in Petah Tikva carries her name.

Work

During World War I Trager helped to arrange care for Jewish refugees arriving in London with severe illnesses. In 1917 she founded the Jewish Free Reading Room, despite assurances that such a venture could not succeed, and it served the Jews of East London for many years.

She published four books: three volumes of stories for children and a memoir Pioneers in Palestine: Stories of one of the first settlers in Petach Tikvah (1923). The children's stories were aimed at English-speaking Jewish children and have been described as "the first Palestinian Jewish children’s literature, recounting what it was to be a young girl or boy at the dawn of the national revival in the Holy Land".

Pioneers in Palestine is a memoir covering the foundation of the city of Petah Tikva, and other aspects of the period including a description of young women campaigning in 1886 for the right to vote.

Publications

  Reprinted 2010 by BiblioBazaar, 
  Reprinted 2013 by Hardpress, 
  Reprinted 2015 by Create Space Independent Publishing,

References

External links
 ( only Pictures of Jewish Home-Life Fifty Years Ago is available)

1870 births
1943 deaths
Jewish women writers